Qameshkan-e Olya (also Romanized as Qameshkān-e ‘Olyā; also known as Qameshgān-e Bālā and Qamīshgān-e ‘Olyā) is a village in Churs Rural District, in the Central District of Chaypareh County, West Azerbaijan Province, Iran. At the 2006 census, its population was 28, in 8 families.

References 

Populated places in Chaypareh County